Majene Regency is one of the six regencies which comprise West Sulawesi Province, Indonesia, on the island of Sulawesi. The town of Majene in the far south of the regency is the administrative capital, and consists of two administrative districts - Banggae and Banggae Timur. The population of Majene Regency was 151,197 at the 2010 Census and 174,407 at the 2020 Census. The official estimate as at mid 2021 was 175,788.

Administration 
The regency is divided into eight districts (kecamatan), tabulated below with their areas and their populations at the 2010 Census and the 2020 Census, and the official estimates as at mid 2021. The table also includes the locations of the district administrative centres, the number of villages (rural desa and urban kelurahan) in each district, and its post code.

Notes: (a) including the urban villages of Banggae, Baru, Pangali-Ali and Totoli. (b) including the urban villages of Baurung and Labuang. (c) including the urban village of Lalampanua. (d) includes the small offshore islands of Pulau Lereklerekan and Pulau Taimanu.

References

External links 

 

Regencies of West Sulawesi